Ernest Dwayne Meighan (15 June 1971 – 9 August 2014) was a Belizean former cyclist. He competed in two events at the 1992 Summer Olympics. He was nicknamed JawMeighan.

He was killed in a shooting in Belize City just before noon on 9 August 2014, along with three other victims.

References

External links
 

1971 births
2014 deaths
Belizean male cyclists
Olympic cyclists of Belize
Cyclists at the 1992 Summer Olympics
Cyclists at the 1998 Commonwealth Games
Cyclists at the 2002 Commonwealth Games
Commonwealth Games competitors for Belize
Place of birth missing